Juha Jyrkkiö (born January 17, 1959) is a Finnish retired professional ice hockey player who played in the SM-liiga. Born in Forssa, he played for FoPS, Jokerit, Ässät and HPK during his 18-year career. At the age of 16, he became the youngest scorer in league history, a record he held for 37 years until Aleksander Barkov Jr. broke it in 2011.

Internationally, he represented his nation at two European Junior Championships (1976, 1977) as well as three World Junior Championships (1977, 1978, 1979). He finished as the fourth-leading scorer at the 1977 World Juniors.

After his playing career, he became a coach. He spent one season in charge of the Ässät under-16 team, leading them to a Junior C championship. He then moved up to the under-20 squad in 2006, where he got to coach his son, Jesse Jyrkkiö. He later coached the Finland national under-16 team.

Career statistics

Regular season and playoffs

International

References

External links
 
 

Living people
1959 births
Finnish ice hockey left wingers
Finnish ice hockey coaches
FoPS players
Jokerit players
Ässät players
HPK players
People from Forssa
Sportspeople from Kanta-Häme